Events from the year 1992 in Jordan.

Incumbents
Monarch: Hussein 
Prime Minister: Zaid ibn Shaker

Sports

1991–92 Jordan League

Establishments

Islamic Action Front.

See also

 Years in Iraq
 Years in Syria
 Years in Saudi Arabia

References

 
1990s in Jordan
Jordan
Jordan
Years of the 20th century in Jordan